The Consensus Model or Systems Perspective of criminal justice argues that the organizations of a criminal justice system either do, or should, work cooperatively to produce justice, as opposed to competitively.
A criminal justice model in which the majority of citizens in a society share the same values and beliefs. Criminal acts conflict with these values and beliefs.

See also
 Conflict Model

References

Criminal law
Law enforcement theory